The 2005 Ho Chi Minh City Open was an ATP men's tennis tournament in Ho Chi Minh City, Vietnam and played on indoor hard courts. The tournament was part of the ATP International Series of the 2005 ATP Tour and was held from September. It was the first time an ATP tournament was held in Vietnam. Unseeded Jonas Björkman won the singles title.

Finals

Singles
 Jonas Björkman defeated  Radek Štěpánek 6–3, 7–6(7–4)

Doubles
 Lars Burgsmüller /  Philipp Kohlschreiber defeated  Ashley Fisher /  Robert Lindstedt 5–6(3–7), 6–4, 6–2

References

External links
 ITF tournament edition details

 
2005 ATP Tour
Tennis in Vietnam